Despedida de Solteros (English: Bachelor Party) is a reality show produced and broadcast by the Argentinian television network Telefe. The show is hosted by Marley and the actress Carina Zampini. It was first aired on January 22, 2017.

Format and rules 
Twelve couples with a main goal of getting married are divided into two different houses: a "loft in the sky" and a "PH in the ground". In there, they are isolated from their partners and the outside world in order to live with strangers. Each week they nominate each other, and contestants with most points face the audience's eviction.

The winning couple win a big wedding party, a honeymoon trip and a house as prizes.

Hosts and segments 
 Despedida de Solteros: Main Show hosted by Carina Zampini and Marley every Sunday
 Despedida de Solteros: Daily hosted by Carina Zampini and Marley, featuring the "Specialists" (Ivana Nadal, Fabián Medina Flores, Connie Ansaldi, Bernardo Stamateas and Gabriel Cartañá) and eliminated contestants, Monday to Tuesday
 Despedida de Solteros: After Hours hosted by Miki Lusardi, Sunday to Tuesday. Broadcast by MTV.

Contestants 

     Contestant lives in the Loft in the Sky.

     Contestant lives in the PH in the Ground.

General results 

     Couple enters or returns to the competition.
     Couple is safe because it didn't receive enough votes in "The Sentence".
     Couple is sentenced by participants voting.
     Couple is sentenced for breaking the rules.
     Couple is exempt from eviction that week.
     Couple is saved from eviction by Specialists' decision.
     Couple is saved from eviction by audience vote.
     Couple competes in a repechage by audience vote.
     Couple leaves the competition by voluntary decision.
     Couple is ejected for breaking the rules.
     Couple is evicted by audience vote.

Wildcards

Crystal room 
The crystal room is a room divided by glass where contestants can make an appointment with their partners, but they can only communicate by telephone and without physical contact. It can be used once by participants through the whole game.

Spy room 
The spy room isf a room where each participant can see images or videos from their partners and the other house. It is used several times a week on the producer's decision and criterion.

Tree house 
The tree house is a space between the PH and the Loft. Each couple can request it once in the whole game. It lasts a few hours in which they can communicate and have physical contact with each other, as long they don't talk about the Sentence and votes.

Switch 
The "Switch" is an instance which allows the couples to exchange houses for 24 hours. It can be used once per couple in the whole game.

Nominations table

Ratings 

     Most viewed departure.
     Least viewed departure.

Rating average: 8.0

References 

2017 Argentine television seasons
2017 Argentine television series debuts
Argentine reality television series
2017 Argentine television series endings